Monica Youngna Youn is an American poet and lawyer.

Life
Youn was raised in Houston, Texas. She graduated from St. Agnes Academy (Texas), Princeton University, Yale Law School with a J.D., and Oxford University with a M. Phil, where she was a Rhodes Scholar.

Literary career

She is the author of three books of poems: Blackacre, Ignatz, and Barter.  Blackacre was longlisted for the 2016 National Book Award for Poetry, shortlisted for the National Book Critics Circle Award in Poetry and was one of The New York Times Book Review's Best Poetry Collections of 2016. Ignatz was a finalist for the 2010 National Book Award in Poetry. 

Her poems have appeared in The New Yorker, Poetry Magazine, The Paris Review, among other journals. She has given readings at the Museum of Modern Art (MOMA), on NPR's All Things Considered and was a keynote reader at the 2012 Association of Writers & Writing Programs Conference.

She currently teaches creative writing at the University of California, Irvine.

Legal career

She was the inaugural Brennan Center Constitutional Fellow at New York University Law School. She formerly directed the campaign finance reform project at the Brennan Center for Justice. She is a member of the bar of the Supreme Court of the United States and was co-lead counsel for Defendant-Intervenors in McComish v. Bennett in 2011. She has appeared on PBS Newshour, Hardball with Chris Matthews, Bill Moyers Journal, and Need to Know. She is the editor of Money, Politics and the Constitution: Beyond Citizens United. She has testified before the Senate Judiciary Committee, the House Judiciary Committee, and the House Committee on Administration.

She was a pledged delegate for Obama in the 2008 presidential election. She has written for Slate, The Los Angeles Times, and The Huffington Post.

Awards

 Stegner Fellowship at Stanford University
 Yaddo residency
 MacDowell fellow
 2008 Witter Bynner Fellowship
 Rockefeller Foundation / Bellagio—Villa Serbelloni,
 National Book Award Finalist 2010
 National Book Award Longlist 2016
 William Carlos Williams Award 2017
 National Book Critics Circle Award finalist 2017
 PEN Open Book Award Finalist 2017
 Guggenheim Fellowship, John Simon Guggenheim Memorial Foundation, New York City, 2018
 Levinson Prize, Poetry Foundation 2019

Bibliography

Poetry

Collections

Poems in anthologies

Non-fiction

Literary criticism
 "Of Poetry and Power: Reflections on the Inauguration", Poetry Foundation

Law

References

External links

Year of birth missing (living people)
Living people
American women poets
Princeton University alumni
Yale Law School alumni
Alumni of University College, Oxford
MacDowell Colony fellows
American women lawyers
New York (state) lawyers
The New Yorker people
21st-century American poets
21st-century American women writers